Mohamed Abdullaziz Al-Deayea (born 2 August 1972) is a Saudi Arabian former professional footballer who played as a football goalkeeper. He participated in four FIFA World Cups for the Saudi Arabia national team and earned a total of 173 officially recognized caps, the record for a goalkeeper.

Club career
Al-Deayea has split his professional career between the clubs Al-Ta'ee and Al-Hilal. Originally he started as a handball player, but was convinced by his club and his older brother Abdullah to become a footballer. Mohammed was under great pressure in the beginning of his career because of having to wear the shoes of his brother Abdullah, who was an AFC Asian Cup winner and a highly reputed goalkeeper too.

Retirement
On 22 June 2010, Mohamed Al-Deayea announced his retirement from football at the age of 37. On 5 January 2012, a big farewell match was organised between Al-Hilal and Juventus F.C. 70,000 people were packed in the King Fahd Stadium. The match ended 7–1 in favour of Juventus with one goal from Saad Al-Harthi. Juventus's goals were scored by Alessandro Del Piero (twice), Eljero Elia, Arturo Vidal, Giorgio Chiellini, Simone Pepe, and Fabio Quagliarella.

Career statistics

Club

International

Honours

Club
Al-Ta'ee
Saudi First Division: 1994–95

Al-Hilal
Saudi Premier League: 2001–02, 2004–05, 2007–08, 2009–10
Saudi Crown Prince Cup: 1999–2000, 2003, 2004–05, 2005–06, 2007–08, 2008–09, 2009–10
Saudi Founder's Cup: 1999-2000
AFC Champions League: 1999–2000
Asian Cup Winners Cup: 2001–02
Asian Super Cup: 2000
Arab Cup Winners' Cup: 2000
Arab Super Cup: 2001

International
Saudi Arabia U-17
FIFA U-17 World Cup: 1989

Saudi Arabia
AFC Asian Cup: 1996
Gulf Cup of Nations: 1994, 2003
Arab Nations Cup: 1998
Islamic Solidarity Games: 2005

Individual
Best Goalkeeper of the AFC Asian Cup: 1996, 2000
Best Goalkeeper of the Gulf Cup of Nations: 1998, 2002
Best Goalkeeper of the GCC Champions League: 2000
Best Goalkeeper of the Arab Champions League': 2001
Best Goalkeeper of the Asian Cup Winners Cup: 2002
He was voted Asia's Goalkeeper of the Century by the International Federation of Football History & Statistics in 1999.
AFC Asian All Stars: 2000
IFFHS Asian Men's Team of All Time: 2021

See also
List of men's footballers with 100 or more international caps

References

External links

Detail of international appearances – by RSSSF

1972 births
Living people
People from Ha'il
Saudi Arabian footballers
Association football goalkeepers
Al-Tai FC players
Al Hilal SFC players
Saudi Professional League players
Asian Games competitors for Saudi Arabia
Saudi Arabia international footballers
Footballers at the 1990 Asian Games
1994 FIFA World Cup players
1995 King Fahd Cup players
1996 AFC Asian Cup players
1997 FIFA Confederations Cup players
1998 FIFA World Cup players
1999 FIFA Confederations Cup players
2000 AFC Asian Cup players
2002 FIFA World Cup players
2006 FIFA World Cup players
AFC Asian Cup-winning players
FIFA Century Club